A volcanic crater lake is a lake in a crater that was formed by explosive activity or a collapse during a volcanic eruption.

Formation
Lakes in calderas fill large craters formed by the collapse of a volcano during an eruption. Lakes in maars fill medium-sized craters where an eruption deposited debris around a vent.

Crater lakes form as the created depression, within the crater rim, is filled by water. The water may come from precipitation, groundwater circulation (often hydrothermal fluids in the case of volcanic craters) or melted ice. Its level rises until an equilibrium is reached between the rates of incoming and outgoing water. Sources of water loss singly or together may include evaporation, subsurface seepage, and, in places, surface leakage or overflow when the lake level reaches the lowest point on its rim. At such a saddle location, the upper portion of the lake is contained only by its adjacent natural volcanic dam; continued leakage through or surface outflow across the dam can erode its included material, thus lowering lake level until a new equilibrium of water flow, erosion, and rock resistance is established. If the volcanic dam portion erodes rapidly or fails catastrophically, the occurrence produces a breakout or outburst flood. With changes in environmental conditions over time, the occurrence of such floods is common to all natural dam types.

Examples

A well-known crater lake, which bears the same name as the geological feature, is Crater Lake in Oregon. It is located in the caldera of Mount Mazama. Crater Lake is fed solely by falling rain and snow, with no inflow or outflow at the surface, and hence is one of the clearest lakes in the world.

This is most likely the highest lake of any kind in the world.

Due to their unstable environments, some crater lakes exist only intermittently. Caldera lakes in contrast can be quite large and long-lasting. For instance, Lake Toba (Indonesia) formed after its eruption around 75,000 years ago.

Dangers
While many crater lakes are picturesque, they can also be deadly. Gas discharges from Lake Nyos in (Cameroon) suffocated 1,800 people in 1986, and crater lakes such as Mount Ruapehu's (New Zealand) often contribute to destructive lahars.

Distinction from other volcanic lakes

Certain bodies of water, although their formation is directly related to volcanic activity, are not usually referred to as crater lakes, including:
Lakes created by volcanic dams due to lava flowing outside of the volcanic edifice/caldera (such as Garibaldi Lake in Canada, Fuji Five Lakes in Japan)
Closed atoll lagoons (such as Clipperton lagoon), whose formation process also implies subsequent biogeomorphologic processes
Ponds encountered at the bottom of waterfalls occurring in volcanic canyons in a volcanic context, but not within a volcanic edifice/caldera (such as Trou de Fer on Réunion Island)

List

Africa

Antarctica and the sub-Antarctic islands

Asia

Europe

North America

Oceania

South America

See also

 Impact crater lake

References